Brianzöö (modern orthography), or Brianzoeu (historical orthography), is a group of variants (Pre-alpine and Western Lombard – macromilanese) of the Western Lombard variety of the Lombard language, spoken in the region of Brianza.

Example

Notes

References

Bibliography
F. Cherubini, Vocabolario milanese-italiano, 5. Sopraggiunta. Nozioni filologiche intorno al Dialetto milanese. Saggio d'osservazioni si l'Idioma brianzuolo, suddialetto del milanese, xix-308 pp., Milano, Società Tipografica dei Classici Italiani, 1856
Triangolo Lariano, Comunità montana del Triangolo Lariano, Canzo, 1980
Grammatica dei dialetti della Lombardia, Mondadori, 2005

See also
Canzés dialect, a northern variety of Brianzöö.

Lombard language